Joseph Théodore Villeneuve de Janti (21 June 1868 – 7 June 1944) Was a French entomologist. He specialised in Diptera.

He worked in Paris at the Pasteur Institute and at the Muséum national d'histoire naturelle. As well as naming many new taxa Villeneuve made significant contributions to medical entomology. He was a Member of the Société Entomologique de France.

Works
Partial list:

1911. "Description de deux nouveaux Diptères". Wien. Entomol. Ztg. 30: 81-84.)
1914. "Etude sur quelques types de myodaires supérieurs. I.Types de Fabricius et de Wiedemann du Museé zoologique de Copenhague". Rev. Zool. Afr. 3: 429-41.
1915. "Diptères nouveaux d'Afrique". Bull. Soc. Entomol. Fr. 1915: 225-27.
1918. "Espèes nouvelles de diptères de la famille des Cypselidae (Borboridae)". Bull. Soc. Entomol. Fr. 1917: 333-38. 
1922. "Descriptions d'espèces nouvelles du genre 'Musca'''". Ann. Sci. Nat. Zool. (10) 5: 335-36.
1926. "Descriptions de myodaires supérieurs nouveaux". Bull. Ann. Soc. R. Entomol. Belg. 66: 269-75.
1927. "Myodaires supérieurs nouveaux de l'Ile de Formose". Rev. Zool. Bot. Afr. 15: 387-97.
1929. "Myodaires supérieurs nouveaux". Bull. Ann. Soc. R. Entomol. Belg. 69: 61-68.
1936. "Schwedisch-chinesische wissenschaftliche Expedition nach den nordwestlichen Provinzen Chinas, unter Leitung von Dr. Sven Hedin und Prof. Sh Ping-chang. Insekten gesammelt vom schwedischen Arzt der Expedition Dr. David Hummel 1927—1930". 52. Diptera. 16. Muscidae. Ark. Zool''. (A) 27(34), 13 p.

References

1868 births
1944 deaths
French entomologists